Ansel (or Anselm) Marshal (died 23 December 1245) was the youngest and last of the five legitimate sons of William Marshal. His name is the Franco-Germanic Hansel or Anseau, and is usually 'Ansel' in documents, though the rarity of the name in England often led it to be mistaken for the Lombardic Anselm. He was named after his father's youngest brother, a household knight active in the 1170s.

Childhood and career
When William Marshal was composing his will in 1219, he originally intended to allot nothing to his youngest son, Ansel, who could not have been older than eight years at the time. It has been suspected that he wished for the young Ansel to rise from low rank to high on his own merits as William himself had done as a young knight errant. His advisors, however, convinced the ailing Marshal to grant Ansel a small piece of land. From later evidence, Ansel was assigned quite a handsome annual revenue of £140 from the Marshal lands in Leinster. He made a career in due course as a knight in the households of his elder brothers Earl Gilbert and Earl Walter. He was married to Matilda, daughter of Earl Humphrey de Bohun of Hereford, and this would probably have been the occasion when Earl Walter granted him the hundred of Bledisloe and the Marshal manors of Awre and Alvington in Gloucestershire, which he had obtained by the end of 1244.

The End of the Marshals
Had he lived longer, Ansel would have become Earl of Pembroke and marshal of England upon the childless death of his brother Walter on 27 November 1245. On 3 December King Henry III notified his intention of delivering his inheritance to Ansel when he should appear to give homage. But by then Ansel must have been himself mortally ill. He died on 23 December 1245 at Chepstow Castle and was buried in the choir of Tintern Abbey near the tombs of his mother and Earl Walter. His young widow had no dower lands out of the Marshal inheritance as the king had never delivered possession of it to Ansel, though she was compensated in part by £60 per annum from Ansel's former Irish rents. She continued to call herself 'Matilda Marshal' for the rest of her life, even after her subsequent marriage to Earl Roger of Winchester. The title of Pembroke went into abeyance on Ansel's death, though the office of marshal of England passed to his eldest sister Matilda Bigot, countess of Norfolk and Warenne and is still held by the earls of Norfolk. The vast Marshal inheritance in England, Wales and Ireland was formally divided in 1245 between Matilda and the children of her three younger sisters, who had all predeceased her.

This remarkable and rapid extinction of the male line of the Marshal family was credited by the historian Matthew Paris to a curse bestowed upon the family in 1218 by the Bishop of Ferns, Ailbe Ua Maíl Mhuaidh (died 1223), as a result of the unjust exactions on his diocese levied by the elder William Marshal. Paris also repeats a story that Countess Isabel tearfully viewed her five sons in their prime in tears, foretelling that each would in turn be holders of the same earldom.

Ancestry

Sources
 Acts and Letters of the Marshal Family 1156-1248: Earls of Pembroke and Marshals of England, ed. David Crouch, Camden Society 5th series, 47 (Cambridge: CUP, 2015).

R.F. Walker, 'The Earls of Pembroke, 1138-1389' in, Pembrokeshire County History ii, Medieval Pembrokeshire, ed. R.F. Walker (Haverfordwest, 2002).

References

Year of birth unknown
1245 deaths
Younger sons of earls